107.3 Touch FM was an independent local radio station broadcasting to the Warwick, Leamington Spa and Kenilworth areas of Warwickshire.

History

OFCOM awarded the Warwick licence to the CN Group in January 2006 for their 2-Day FM application. However, it took the group over two years to commence broadcasting, which they eventually did on Friday 4 April at 7 pm under the name of 107.3 Touch Radio. The initial presenter line-up was Ben Day, who left The Severn to take up his new position on Breakfast, Louisa Allen on mid-mornings, Mikey Faulkner on drive and Matt Walters on the evening show.

The CN Group later sold its Midland based Touch Radio Network to Quidem. The station was then re-branded to 107.3 Touch FM.

In September 2019, Quidem announced it had entered a brand licensing agreement with Global, citing financial losses. Two months later, following permission from regulator, Ofcom to change the station's format, it was confirmed Touch FM (Warwick) would merge with its Quidem-owned sister stations and launch as Capital Mid-Counties on 2 December 2019.

Local output for the Mid-Counties region consists of a three-hour regional Drivetime show on weekdays, alongside localised news bulletins, traffic updates and advertising for Warwick, Leamington Spa and Kenilworth. Touch FM ceased broadcasting at 7pm on Friday 29 November 2019.

References

External links
 107.3 Touch FM official website
 107.3 Touch FM's listing on Media UK
 Ben Day and Nick Jewers from 107.3 Touch Radio visit Kenilworth Castle's "Fool School"

Defunct radio stations in the United Kingdom
Radio stations in Warwickshire
Radio stations established in 2008